Luciano Javier Cabral Melgarejo (born April 26, 1995) is an Argentine-born Chilean footballer who plays as an attacking midfielder for Chilean Primera División side Coquimbo Unido.

Club career
He returned to professional football for the 2023 season, after signing with Coquimbo Unido in the Chilean Primera División.

International career
He represented Chile at under-20 level in the 2015 South American Championship.

Personal life
He naturalized Chilean since his grandfather was born in Chile.

In June 2018, he was given a  years prison sentence due to he was linked along with his father to a homicide occurred in January 2017 in Mendoza, Argentina. Due to his good behavior, he has worked as an experience teller for the Club Sportivo El Porvenir from San Rafael at the same time he performs as a player. In September 2022, he became on parole.

References

External links
 
 

1995 births
Living people
Sportspeople from Mendoza Province
Argentine footballers
Argentine sportspeople of Chilean descent
Naturalized citizens of Chile
Chilean footballers
Chile under-20 international footballers
Comisión de Actividades Infantiles footballers
Argentinos Juniors footballers
Club Athletico Paranaense players
Coquimbo Unido footballers
Torneo Argentino A players
Primera Nacional players
Argentine Primera División players
Campeonato Brasileiro Série A players
Chilean Primera División players
Argentine expatriate footballers
Chilean expatriate footballers
Argentine emigrants to Chile
Expatriate footballers in Chile
Expatriate footballers in Brazil
Argentine expatriate sportspeople in Brazil
Chilean expatriate sportspeople in Brazil
Chilean people of Argentine descent
Citizens of Chile through descent
Association football midfielders